Treasure Island, original title Die Schatzinsel, is a German-French mini-series, produced for German television station ZDF in 1966. The screenplay by Walter Ulbrich, who also co-produced the film, remains largely close to Robert Louis Stevenson's classic 1883 novel Treasure Island.

Plot 
 The first part Der alte Freibeuter ("The Old Pirate", about 80 minutes) tells the relationship between Jim and Billy Bones, as well as the dangerous adventures with the pirates at the Hawkins Inn. It ends with Squire Trelawney chartering a boat in Bristol.
 The second part Der Schiffskoch ("The Ship's cook", about 88 minutes) introduces Long John Silver and the other pirates, as well as the preparations for the journey. At sea, Jim overhears at night that Silver is a pirate and informs the non-pirate crew members.
 The third part Das Blockhaus ("The Block House", about 91 minutes) tells the start of the fight on Treasure Island and the non-pirates hiding in the wooden house, as well as introducing Ben Gunn.
 The fourth part Die Entscheidung ("The Decision", about 84 minutes) shows Jim Hawkins entering the Hispaniola and his fight with Israel Hands, as well as the final outcome which is close to the book.

Cast 
 Michael Ande as Jim Hawkins
 Ivor Dean as Long John Silver
 Georges Riquier as Dr. David Livesey
 Jacques Dacqmine as Squire John Trelawney
 Jacques Monod as Captain Alexander Smollet
 Dante Maggio as Billy Bones
 Jean Mauvais as Blinder Pew / James Brandon
 Sylvain Lévignac as Black Dog
 Jacques Godin as Israel Hands
 Dominique Maurin as Tom Purcell
 Jean Saudray as Ben Gunn
 Ilsemarie Schnering as Jim Hawkins' mother
 François Darbon as Marc Hawkins, Jim's father
 Hellmut Lange as the narrator

Background 
After successful adaptions of Robinson Crusoe and Don Quijote, Treasure Island was the third in a row of sixteen television adventures mini-series by ZDF between 1964 and 1983. It was filmed at the Lake Garda with an international cast and crew. Michael Ande, who portrayed Jim, suffered a serious accident during filming and had to be doubled in some scenes. It was produced on 35 mm film with many small details and even in colour, although colour television was introduced on German television only in 1967 (so the first screening had to be in black and white).

After the success of the mini-series, Ivor Dean (who portrayed John Silver) worked on a follow-up film with producer Robert S. Baker, but it never materialised before Dean's death in 1974. Baker continued to develop the project and it was finally made as the 10 part serial Return to Treasure Island in 1986.

Reception 
The mini-series remains well-regarded and popular in the German-language area, it is even considered a "mythos of German television history". Despite being over 50 years old, it is still screened at least about once a year on television. It is little-known in other countries.

External links

References

Television series based on Treasure Island